Kottu roti, alternatively spelled kothu roti, is a Sri Lankan dish consisting of chopped roti, a meat curry dish of choice (such as mutton, beef, seafood, or chicken), along with scrambled egg, onions, and chillies. The ingredients are chopped together using special cleavers as they sautee on a hot griddle. A variation of the dish is found in the South Indian states of Tamil Nadu and Kerala, known as kothu parotta, which is made using parotta instead of roti. Kottu roti can also be found internationally in restaurants in regions containing Tamil, Sinhalese and Malayali diaspora populations.

History 

The word koththu means "to chop" in Tamil, referring to its method of preparation. This has been simplified in Tamil and Sinhalese to Kothu or Kottu respectively. It is generally considered that it originated as street food in the eastern Tamil regions of Trincomalee or Batticaloa in the 1960s/1970s, as an inexpensive meal for the lower socio-economic classes. The basic rotti is made of Gothamba flour, a flour made out of a variety of grains-referring to the white flour. 

Preparation
Kottu, is made up of paratha or godamba roti, which is cut into small pieces or ribbons. Then on a heated iron sheet or griddle, vegetables and onions are fried. Eggs, cooked meat, or fish are added to fried vegetables and heated for a few minutes. Finally, the pieces of cut paratha are added. These are chopped and mixed by repeated pounding using heavy iron blades/spatula, the sound of which is very distinctive and can usually be heard from a long distance. Depending upon what ingredients are used, the variations are vegetable, egg, chicken, beef, mutton, and fish kottu roti. It is often prepared and served as a fast food dish.

See also 

 Cuisine of Sri Lanka

References

External links

Flatbread dishes
Sri Lankan cuisine
Tamil cuisine
Kerala cuisine